Peter Krikes is an American screenwriter who contributed to the screenplay for Star Trek IV: The Voyage Home (1986).

Filmography 

 Star Trek IV: The Voyage Home (1986)
 Anna and the King (1999)
 Double Impact (1991)
 Back to the Beach (1987)

References

External links

American male screenwriters
Living people
Year of birth missing (living people)